Histone H2B type 2-F is a protein that in humans is encoded by the HIST2H2BF gene.

References

Further reading